Flesh and Blood is a 1951 British drama film with Richard Todd in a dual role. Based upon the play A Sleeping Clergyman by James Bridie, it tells the story of three generations of the Scottish Cameron family, with its various conflicts and romances.

It was shot at Teddington Studios.

Cast

Richard Todd as Charles Cameron Sutherland
Glynis Johns as Katherine
Joan Greenwood as Wilhelmina
André Morell as Dr Marshall
Ursula Howells as Harriet
Freda Jackson as Mrs Hannah
George Cole as John Hannah
James Hayter as Sir Douglas Manley
Ronald Howard as Purley
Muriel Aked as Mrs Walker
Michael Hordern as Webster
Helen Christie as Minnie Arnott
Walter Fitzgerald as Dr Cooper
Lilly Kann as Sister Maria
Patrick Macnee as Sutherland
Fred Johnson as Donovan
Molly Weir as Margaret
Hugh Dempster as Cranley
Alexander Gauge as Coutts
Betty Paul as Moira
Peter Macdonell as Jordan
Hector MacGregor as Major
John Vere as Leighton
Enzo Coticchia as Forzin
Archie Duncan as Sergeant
Francis De Wolff as Ambassador
Kenneth Downey as Club Porter
Sergio Mari as Mario
David Cameron as McDermott
Bill Logan as McGregor
Anna Canitano as Nurse
John Kelly as Wilkinson
Joan Heal as a girl in the night club
Nina Parry as child Wilhelmina
Billy Newsbury as child John Hannah
Sally Owen as the doll
William Chappell as the dancer
Jock Mckay as Baker

References

External links

Films with screenplays by Anatole de Grunwald
Films produced by Anatole de Grunwald
Films set in the 19th century
Films set in the 1910s
Films set in Glasgow
1950s historical drama films
British historical drama films
Films shot at Teddington Studios
London Films films
Films directed by Anthony Kimmins
1950s English-language films